Titerno is a   (Local Action Group) in the Province of Benevento, Campania Region, Italy. Member communities include:
 Castelvenere
 Cerreto Sannita
 Cusano Mutri
 Faicchio
 Guardia Sanframondi
 Pietraroja
 Ponte
 Pontelandolfo
 San Lorenzello
 San Lorenzo Maggiore
 San Lupo
 San Salvatore Telesino

External links
 G.A.L. Titerno (Italian)

Geography of Campania